KKTC (99.9 MHz) is a commercial FM radio station licensed to Angel Fire, New Mexico. 
It serves Northern New Mexico including Taos.  It has a classic country radio format.  KKTC is owned by L.M.N.O.C. Broadcasting LLC, and retransmits via a booster station (KKTC-FM1) in Taos itself.

References

External links
 

KTC
Country radio stations in the United States
Mass media in Taos, New Mexico
Radio stations established in 1993
1993 establishments in New Mexico